Nephelolychnis ceadesalis is a moth in the family Crambidae. It was described by Francis Walker in 1859. It is found in Cameroon, the Democratic Republic of the Congo, Ghana and Kenya.

References

Moths described in 1859
Pyraustinae